Barefoot to Goa is a 2015 Indian Hindi drama film directed and produced by Praveen Morchhale. It narrates the story of two school-going kids living in Mumbai. Its release in India was crowdfunded through Morchhale's Proud Funding Campaign. It was released on 10 April 2015.Legendary Indian Playback singer KJ Yesudas sung a song in this film . It was the first after 2 decades Yesudas sung in a bollywood film.

Cast 
Saara Nahar as Diya
Prakhar Morchhale as Prakhar
Farrukh Jaffar as the grandmother
Kuldeep Dubey as the father
Purva Parag as the mother
Ajay Chourey

Release 
Barefoot to Goa was screened at the Bengaluru International Film Festival (BIFFES). In India, it was released on 10 April 2015.

References

External links